Landscapes is a compilation album of various artist playing music composed by Peter Sculthorpe. It was produced by 2MBS-FM for Sculthorpe's 60th birthday. Articst and bands appearing on the album include Sculthorpe, David Bollard, Seymour Group, Geoffrey Tozer and David Pereira The album was nominated for 1990 ARIA Award for Best Classical Album.

Track listing

Reqiuem
1. Introit
2. Kyrie
3. Qui Mariam
4. Lacrimosa
5. Libera Me
6. Lux Aeterna

7. Djilile
8. Tailitnama Song
9. Mountains
10. Landscape II

Four Little Pieces
11. Morning Song 
12. Sea Chant
13. Little Serenade 
14. Left Bank Waltz

References

Compilation albums by Australian artists
1989 compilation albums